PZ Cassiopeiae is a red supergiant star located in the Cassiopeia constellation, and a semi-regular variable star.

Characteristics 
PZ Cassiopeiae is a luminous red supergiant star, one of the largest stars currently known with a radius over 1,000 times the Sun's radius, and also the one of most luminous of its type, around 200,000 times more luminous than the Sun. It is likely to be part of the Cas OB5 stellar association although apparently much younger than the other stars in the association.

Its distance from Earth was initially estimated to be around 7,800 light-years (2.4 kiloparsecs). These parameters are all similar to those estimated for the red hypergiant VY Canis Majoris.

PZ Cas is a slow semi-regular variable star with the period quoted as 925 days in the General Catalogue of Variable Stars, although periods of 850 and 3,195 days have been derived. The visual range is approximate magnitude 8–10, large for this type of variable.

Supergiant or AGB star
PZ Cas has traditionally been treated as a massive supergiant, comparable to others such as VY CMa, but there is some evidence that it is a possible less massive O-rich S- or SC-type Asymptotic Giant Branch (AGB) or post-AGB star.  It shows enrichment of Zr and Ba, but not Li as would be expected for a true supergiant.

Companion
PZ Cas has a Cepheid variable companion, a 13th magnitude star 12" away.

See also
 TZ Cassiopeiae

References 

M-type supergiants
M-type hypergiants
Cassiopeia (constellation)
Cassiopeiae, PZ
Durchmusterung objects
117078
Double stars